The Battle of Jericho, as described in the Biblical Book of Joshua, was the first battle fought by the Israelites in the course of the conquest of Canaan. Excavations at Tell es-Sultan, the biblical Jericho, have failed to substantiate this story, which has its origins in the nationalist propaganda of much later kings of Judah and their claims to the territory of the Kingdom of Israel. The lack of archaeological evidence and the composition, history and theological purposes of the Book of Joshua have led archaeologists like William G. Dever to characterise the story of the fall of Jericho as "invented out of whole cloth".

Biblical account
According to the Book of Joshua, when the Israelites were encamped at Shittim opposite Jericho, ready to cross the river, Joshua, as a final preparation, sent out two spies to Jericho. The spies stayed in the house of Rahab, a local prostitute. The king of Jericho sent soldiers who asked Rahab to bring out the spies. Instead, she hid them under bundles of flax on the roof. After escaping, the spies promised to spare Rahab and her family after taking the city, if she would mark her house by hanging a red cord out the window.

After the Israelites crossed the Jordan, the king of Jericho ordered that the gates of the walls be closed. God commanded Joshua to go around the walls of Jericho for six days, once every day, and seven times on the seventh day. God commanded the city to be attacked by seven priests blowing trumpets, with the Ark of the Covenant in front of them and all the people behind the Ark of the Covenant. They encircled the wall of Jericho once a day for the first six days, and then encircled the city seven times on the seventh day. After the sound of the shofar sounded a great blow, the Israelites cheered and the city walls fell beneath them.

Following God's law, the Israelites killed every man and woman of every age, as well as the oxen, sheep, and donkeys. Only Rahab, her parents, brothers and all "those who belonged to her" were spared. They were incorporated into Israel. Joshua then cursed anybody who rebuilt the foundations and gates, with the deaths of their firstborn and youngest child respectively. This was eventually fulfilled by Hiel the Bethelite under King Ahab's reign.

Origins and historicity

Excavations at Tell es-Sultan 
In 1868, Charles Warren identified Tell es-Sultan as the site of biblical Jericho. Ernst Sellin and Carl Watzinger excavated the site between 1907–1909 and in 1911, finding the remains of two walls which they initially suggested supported the biblical account of the Battle of Jericho. They later revised this conclusion and dated their finds to the Middle Bronze Age (1950-1550 BCE). In 1930–1936, John Garstang conducted excavations there and discovered the remains of a network of collapsed walls which he dated to about 1400 BCE. Kathleen Kenyon re-excavated the site over 1952–1958 and demonstrated that the destruction occurred at an earlier time, during a well-attested Egyptian campaign against the Hyksos of that period, and that Jericho had been deserted throughout the mid-late 13th century BCE, the supposed time of Joshua's battle. Sources differ as to what date Kenyon instead proposed; either c. 1500 BCE  or c. 1580 BCE. Kenyon's work was corroborated in 1995 by radiocarbon tests which dated the destruction level to the late 17th or 16th centuries BCE. A small unwalled settlement was rebuilt in the 15th century BCE, but it has been agreed that the tell was unoccupied from the late 15th century until the 10th/9th centuries BCE.

More recently, Lorenzo Nigro from the Italian-Palestinian Expedition to Tell es-Sultan has argued that there was some sort of settlement at the site during the 14th and 13th centuries BCE. He states that the expedition has detected Late Bronze II layers in several parts of the tell, although its top layers were heavily cut by levelling operations during the Iron Age, which explains the scarcity of 13th century materials. Nigro rejects the idea that these discoveries give credence to the biblical narrative about the conquest of Canaan by Joshua.

Historicity 
Scholars agree almost unanimously that the Book of Joshua holds little historical value. Its origin lies in a time far removed from the times that it depicts, and its intention is primarily theological in detailing how Israel and her leaders are judged by their obedience to the teachings and laws (the covenant) set down in the Book of Deuteronomy. The story of Jericho and the rest of the conquest represents the nationalist propaganda of the Kingdom of Judah and their claims to the territory of the Kingdom of Israel after 722 BCE; those chapters were later incorporated into an early form of Joshua likely written late in the reign of King Josiah (reigned 640–609  BCE), and the book was revised and completed after the fall of Jerusalem to the Babylonians in 586, and possibly after the return from the Babylonian exile in 538.

See also

 Ai (Bible)
 Biblical archaeology
 "Joshua Fit the Battle of Jericho", African-American spiritual about the battle

References

Bibliography

External links
 

Biblical Jericho
Jericho
Jericho
Book of Joshua
Massacres in the Bible
Ark of the Covenant